Peter Lynch is an American stock investor.

Peter Lynch may also refer to:

Peter Lynch (director), Canadian filmmaker
Peter Lynch (meteorologist), Irish mathematician and meteorologist
Peter Lynch (mining engineer) (1964–2017), Australian mining engineer
Pete Lynch (musician) (born 1980), American singer and songwriter
Peter Lynch (politician) (died 1967), Irish Senator